The subthalamic fasciculus is a bi-directional neural tract that connects the subthalamic nucleus and the globus pallidus.

References

External links
 http://isc.temple.edu/neuroanatomy/lab/atlas/dan1/
 https://web.archive.org/web/20071126015854/http://www.sci.uidaho.edu/med532/subthalamus.htm

Basal ganglia connections
Subthalamus